Hulu Langat District is a district located in the southeastern corner of Selangor, between Kuala Lumpur and Negeri Sembilan. It is bordered by the state of Pahang to the east and north, Gombak district to the north-west, Federal Territory of Kuala Lumpur and Petaling district to the west, Sepang district to the south-west, and state of Negeri Sembilan to the south.

Hulu Langat is the fifth largest district in Selangor State with an area of 840 square kilometres and the second most populous district with a population of 1,400,461 at the 2020 Census (provisional result). It is also the second most densely populated district with approximately 1688 people per km2. It has a mix of urban and rural settlements with a majority of the population settling in towns near Kuala Lumpur. These population centers, such as Cheras and Ampang effectively became suburbs of the greater metropolitan area (both Cheras and Ampang are communities now divided administratively between Kuala Lumpur Federal Territory and Selangor State).

Hulu Langat has a median income of RM8361 (2019), which is the fourth highest in the state and country behind Petaling, Sepang and Gombak. The figure is higher than both the state, RM8210 (2019) and national median income of RM5873 (2019).

Population

According to the Department of Statistics, Malaysia, Hulu Langat's population increased from 1,138,198 in 2010 to 1,400,416 in 2020.

The following is based on Department of Statistics Malaysia 2020 forecast.

Administrative divisions

Hulu Langat District is divided into 7 mukims, which are:

Local Area Government

Ampang Jaya Municipal Council (Mukim Ampang only)
Kajang Municipal Council (Most parts of the district except Mukim Ampang)

Federal Parliament and State Assembly Seats

List of Hulu Langat district representatives in the Federal Parliament (Dewan Rakyat)

List of Hulu Langat district representatives in the State Legislative Assembly (Dewan Undangan Negeri)

Infrastructure

Public transportation
The Phase-2 of MRT Sungai Buloh-Kajang Line (MRT SBK) which opened in July 2017 runs through several areas in this district, previously not served by any railway service. The MRT stations under this district are Taman Suntex, Sri Raya, Bandar Tun Hussein Onn, Batu 11 Cheras, Bukit Dukung, Sungai Jernih, Stadium Kajang, and Kajang station which is the southern terminus of the MRT SBK line. Kajang station also acts as the interchange point with the KTM ETS service and KTM Komuter Seremban Line. The Komuter line also passes through Bangi and UKM stations within the district

The district is also widely served by public bus service run by Rapid KL. Bus routes in the district fall under the Ampang Corridor and Cheras Corridor.

Highways
The district is served by the Kuala Lumpur–Seremban Expressway, the Cheras–Kajang Expressway, the Kajang Dispersal Link Expressway (Silk Highway), and the Kajang - Seremban Highway (LEKAS) with essential links to other major highways. Meanwhile, a new expressway, East Klang Valley Expressway EKVE, which connects Ukay Perdana, Ampang and Sungai Long, Kajang is currently under construction and is expected to be completed by the end of 2022.

Education 
Hulu Langat District is home to a number of higher education institutions.

Public universities 

 Universiti Kebangsaan Malaysia (UKM), Bangi

Private universities and university colleges 

 Infrastructure University Kuala Lumpur (IUKL), Kajang
 German-Malaysian Institute (GMI), Bangi
 Universiti Tenaga Nasional (UNITEN), Kajang
 Kolej Universiti Islam Antarabangsa Selangor (KUIS), Kajang
 Universiti Tunku Abdul Rahman (UTAR), Sungai Long
 University of Nottingham (Malaysia campus), Semenyih
 New Era University College, Kajang

Places of interest
Hulu Langat town is famous for its durians. This town is also popular for its recreational activities and natural surroundings. Due to its near location to the city of Kuala Lumpur Hulu Langat is a popular spot to the local tourist for recreational activities. Among the popular spots of eco-tourism are the Sungai Gabai Waterfalls, the Semenyih Water Reservoir and the Congkak River Forest Recreational Center. Another latest hot spot for tourism is the Sungai Lopoh, located at 22nd Mile of Jalan Hulu Langat and the Kuala Lumpur Look Out Point Tourist Complex, located at Jalan Ampang–Hulu Langat. Near Sungai Lui, Hulu Langat lays a famous Malay residents named Shahid Ramlee Mansion, which was once before settled by Tan Sri P.Ramlee, Malaysia 70s famous actor.

Near Lembah Pangsun lies Mount Nuang (1,483m), a training ground for hikers and runners before they climb Mount Kinabalu or do a marathon. There are two hots spring in Hulu Langat one is Dusun Tua Hot Spring located at 16th mile and Sungai Serai Hot Spring .

Balakong consists of various shopping malls that are frequented by tourists and locals, such as AEON (Jusco) Cheras Selatan Balakong .

Kajang town on the other hand is famous for its satay, which is very popular amongst the locals as well as tourists.

Pekan Batu 14 Hulu Langat

Pekan Batu 14 Hulu Langat is an old town which 14 miles from Kuala Lumpur.

Landmark

- Masjid Sultan Hisamuddin Alam Shah

- Dewan Dato Nazir Hulu Langat

- Balai Polis Pekan Batu 14 Hulu Langat

Pekan Batu 18 Hulu Langat

Pekan Batu 18 Hulu Langat is an old town which 18 miles from Kuala Lumpur.

It is also a Famous Place for Cycling Gathering Point

Landmark

- Balai Polis Pekan Batu 18 Hulu Langat

- SJK (C) CHOON HWA

See also
 Districts of Malaysia

References

External links